Belgrano was a French sail and steam liner, belonging to the Compagnie des Chargeurs Réunis.

Career
Built as Louis XIV for the company Quesnel Frères, the ship was purchased by the newly founded Compagnie des Chargeurs Réunis, and renamed Belgrano while on keel. Launched on 24 April 1872, she shuttled between La Plata and Le Havre, carrying immigrants to Argentina.

In 1880, Belgrano was transformed into a cooling ship and ferried meat from Argentina to France.

Notes and references
Notes

Citations

References
 Painting notice at the Musée national de la Marine

1872 ships
Ships built in France
Steamships of France
Merchant ships of France